Ziloti may refer to

Alexander Siloti, Russian pianist, conductor and composer
Ziloti, Xanthi, a settlement in the Xanthi regional unit, Greece